Şehzade Süleyman (Ottoman Turkish: شهزاده سليمان; 1613 – 27 July 1635) was an Ottoman prince and the son of Sultan Ahmed I and his wife Kösem Sultan. He was the brother of Murad IV and Ibrahim, and half-brother of Osman II.

Life 
Şehzade Süleyman was born in 1614 in Topkapı Palace to Ahmed I and (very probraly) Kösem Sultan. Following his father's early death in 1617, he and his siblings were exiled to the Old Palace (Eski Saray).

After Murad’s accession in 1623, Süleyman was confined in the Kafes.

Death 
In 1635, Süleyman, his (maybe) brother Selim and his half-brother Bayezid were executed during the celebrations over the victory at Erivan. The orders were carried out by Murad IV, the cause of Süleyman’s execution is unknown. It was most likely that he was found favored on the throne by Murad's opponents and rivals that wanted to overthrown him.

After his death, he was buried in his father Ahmed I's mausoleum in the Blue Mosque.

References

External links 

17th-century Ottoman royalty

Ottoman princes
1613 births
1635 deaths